Daniel Kovalik (born 1968) is an American human rights, labor rights lawyer. He has contributed articles to CounterPunch and The Huffington Post. He teaches International Human Rights at the University of Pittsburgh School of Law.

Education
Kovalik graduated from the Columbia Law School in 1993.

Career work
Kovalik has been involved in international human rights and social justice, mainly in Latin America. Kovalik's first book, The Plot to Scapegoat Russia, was published in 2017 by Skyhorse Publishing. He was co-author of the book No More War: How the West Violates International Law by Using 'Humanitarian' Intervention to Advance Economic and Strategic Interests, which was published by Skyhorse Publishing in 2020.

Colombia
He worked on the Alien Tort Claims Act cases against The Coca-Cola Company, Drummond Company and Occidental Petroleum over alleged human rights abuses in Colombia. Kovalik accused the United States of intervention in Colombia saying it has threatened peaceful actors there so it may "make Colombian land secure for massive appropriation and exploitation". He also accused the Colombian and United States governments of overseeing mass killings in Colombia between 2002 and 2009.

Venezuela
Kovalik is a supporter of the Venezuelan government. He has defended the Venezuelan government following both the 2014 Venezuelan protests and the Venezuela Defense of Human Rights and Civil Society Act of 2014 law enacted by the United States allowing the sanctioning of individuals who allegedly violated the human rights of Venezuelans. In a radio interview with Matt Dwyer about Venezuela's 2013 elections, Kovalik called the Bolivarian Revolution "the most benevolent revolution in history". On 26 February 2014, he attended the "Chávez Was Here" gathering created by the Embassy of Venezuela, Washington, D.C. to commemorate the presidency of Hugo Chávez and to show support for the Bolivarian Revolution. At the gathering, Kovalik spoke beside the Venezuelan ambassador Julio Escalona and economist Mark Weisbrot.

United States
Kovalik is the Associate General Counsel of the United Steelworkers union.

Recognition
3rd Most Significant Censored Story Award by Project Censored (2001)
David W. Mills Mentoring Fellowship by Stanford University School of Law (2002)

References

External links

 Official Website
 The Coca-Cola Case Film

American political activists
American human rights activists
Workers' rights activists
Free speech activists
American political writers
American foreign policy writers
American male non-fiction writers
21st-century American non-fiction writers
21st-century American lawyers
Columbia Law School alumni
Pennsylvania lawyers
Writers from Pittsburgh
1968 births
Living people
People from Louisville, Kentucky